Annette Smith Burgess (1899 – August 1, 1962) was an American medical illustrator and instructor at the Johns Hopkins School of Medicine.

Early life
Annette Smith was born in Baltimore, Maryland in 1899 to Richard Henry Smith and his wife. She attended public schools in Baltimore. She graduated from the Maryland Institute College of Art where she studied under Max Brödel. She attended Johns Hopkins University from 1923 to 1926.

Career
In 1926, Burgess was hired by William Holland Wilmer to become the first ophthalmic illustrator and the first medical illustrator at the Wilmer Eye Institute at the Johns Hopkins School of Medicine. In 1948, she became an instructor of medical illustration at Johns Hopkins in its "Art as Applied to Medicine" program until she retired on July 1, 1961. Over her 35 year career, Burgess painted and drew practically all of the illustrations that appeared in medical publications of the work and research done at the Wilmer Eye Institute.

She made her illustrations using acetate sheets with an ophthalmoscope and slit lamp. She drew illustrations of eyes, particularly the fundus, including eyes infected with different diseases. These illustrations became internationally recognized because Burgess's illustrations were able to illuminate structures of the eye that photography could not; making it easier to educate and communicate research on diseases of the eye.

She was a charter member of the Association of Medical Illustrators. She was listed in the Who's Who of Women in America.

Selected works
She was the illustrator of the following publications:
 Wilmer Atlas of Fundi Occuli (1934), William Holland Wilmer
 Endogenous Uyeitis (1956), Alan C. Woods
  Endogenous Inflammations of the Uveal Tract (1961), Alan C. Woods

Death
After moving to Jackson, Mississippi in 1961, she died on August 1, 1962 at the University of Mississippi Hospital in Jackson. She was buried at Mount Olivet Cemetery in Baltimore.

Legacy
The Department of Art as Applied to Medicine at Johns Hopkins established the Annette Burgess Award. The award has been presented since 1967.

References

1899 births
1962 deaths
People from Baltimore
Medical illustrators
American women illustrators
Maryland Institute College of Art alumni
Johns Hopkins University faculty